Jorge Sebastián Núñez (born December 10, 1986) is a former Argentine football player.

Club statistics

References

External links

1986 births
Living people
Argentine footballers
Argentine expatriate footballers
J1 League players
J2 League players
Nagoya Grampus players
Hokkaido Consadole Sapporo players
Expatriate footballers in Japan
Association football midfielders
Footballers from Rosario, Santa Fe